The EMU101 is a medium-capacity train operating on Taipei Metro's Circular line. A total of 17 4-car trains were manufactured by Hitachi Rail Italy (formerly AnsaldoBreda) in Reggio Calabria, then shipped to Hsinchu for final assembly at Taiwan Rolling Stock Company (TRSC). This is the second time Taiwan has purchased trains made in Italy after Taiwan Railways' EMU300 series, built by Socimi.

This is Taipei Metro's third medium-capacity train, and officially entered service with the opening of the first phase of the Circular line on 31 January 2020.

History 
In 2009, the Taipei City Government held a tender for the first phase of the construction of the Circular line, and the bid was awarded to AnsaldoBreda (now Hitachi Rail Italy) for designing and manufacturing the Driverless Metro trains. In August 2016, the AnsaldoBreda factory in Reggio Calabria held a delivery ceremony. In November, it arrived at South Depot for various tests and subsequent integration operations. Dynamic testing started in mid 2017.

Design 
There are many differences from the designs and innovations of the existing medium-capacity trains of the Taipei Metro, except that the EMU101 uses the same steel wheels as the high-capacity trains, and the carriages have open-gangway connections. This greatly increases the capacity and the seats are more ergonomically designed. The trains have the external sliding doors of the other lines, instead of the plug doors found on all other trains in the Hitachi Rail Italy Driverless Metro family.

Train formation 
A complete four-car set consists of an identical twin set of one end car (A or B) and one intermediate car (C or D) permanently coupled together. The configuration of a Circular line train in revenue service is A–C–D–B.

Each carriage is assigned its own three-digit serial number, which ranges from 101 to 117.
 The first digit after the carriage identification letter (A, C, D or B) is always a 1.
 The other two digits are the identification number of the train the car is part of.

References 
This article incorporates information from the corresponding articles on the Chinese and Japanese Wikipedia's.

External links 

Electric multiple units of Taiwan
AnsaldoBreda multiple units
Taipei Metro
750 V DC multiple units